The Sonic Boom of the South is the marching band of Jackson State University (JSU) located in Jackson, Mississippi, US.

History
The marching band began in the 1940s at what was then Jackson State College, under the directorship of Frederick D. Hall, who had directed a band at the college as early as the 1920s, in addition to the chorus and orchestra. It was initially made up of students from Jackson College and Lanier High School.

Founded as the Jackson State University Marching Band, the name "Sonic Boom of the South" was adopted by director Harold J. Haughton Sr. in 1971, having been suggested by band members. The first fulltime band director, William W. Davis, was appointed in 1948, replacing Charles Saulsburg, who had been director since 1947. Davis had previously played trumpet in Cab Calloway's band, and Calloway's musical style and showmanship influenced Davis's conceptualization of the marching band. The band at this time had around 20 members, increasing to 88 in 1963. Davis retired as director in 1971, but remained the chief arranger for the band. He was replaced by Harold J. Haughton.

Haughton acted as director until 1983; during his tenure he changed the band uniform color from royal blue to light navy blue, introduced the Motown hit "Get Ready" as the band's theme, replaced the Majorettes with featured dancers and introduced the "Tiger Run-on" shuffle, "Tiger Strut" and "Floating JSU" halftime display. In Fall of 1983, shortly before Haughton left for an equivalent position at Virginia State University, he increased the band size to 160 members. He was replaced as director by Dowell Taylor.

Taylor, an alumnus of the band, served as director from 1984 to 1992.

In 1992, Lewis Liddell became the third alumnus to lead the Sonic Boom of the South. The dancing "Baby Tigers" first appeared in a halftime show in 1994. In 2000, Liddell established the "Jackson 5" drum majors (also known as J5 - previously the Fabulous 4). In 2003, the marching band was enshrined in the NCAA Hall of Champions.

O'Neill Sanford was director from 2016 to August 2017. Sanford undertook recruitment duties, traveling throughout the US and to the Virgin Islands to recruit "the best high school band musicians".

Dowell Taylor returned as interim director in September 2017. Band size has decreased from 350 musicians to around 210 as a result of budget constraints.

In 2018, the SBOTS became the first and only collegiate marching band chosen to be featured by Great Big Story.

In 2022, SBOTS was featured on ABC's Good Morning America during JSU's homecoming week.

The SBOTS has also performed at a few notable occasions such as Motown 30th Anniversary, the 34th National Association for the Advancement of Colored People (NAACP) Image Awards, alongside "Cedric the Entertainer", a number of NFL games and their most recent performance at the 2021 Presidential Inauguration Parade.

Marching style

The band marches with a high step, raising the knees to 90° and pointing the toes downwards. This military-style march is distinct from that employed by high school bands who march with a "corps step", keeping feet close to the ground and landing heel first, rolling forward onto the toes. The marchers also sway their bodies side-to-side in unison. When the band performs displays where the initials of the university ("JSU") or other initials are formed the marchers have to take exact steps of 22½ inches.

Primary repertoire

The Sonic Boom of the South primary repertoire includes the following:

"Jackson Fair, Jackson Dear" (Alma Mater)
"Cheer Boys" (Fight Song)
"J-S-U Rocks The House!", a fan favorite spirit song
"I'm So Glad I Go to JSU", inspired by "I'm So Glad" from Delta blues legend Skip James
"Talkin' Out the Side of Your Neck", a 1980s Funk/R&B classic by Cameo
"We Came to Play!", a 1970s Soul/Funk classic by Tower of Power
"The Show", a 1980s Hip-Hop classic  by Doug E Fresh
"Everything", a 2000s Rap song by David Banner featuring Twista
"I Got 5 on It", a 1990s Rap song by Luniz
"Big Ballin'", a 1990s Rap song by Big Tymers
"Black and Blues", a 1980s Jazz/R&B song by Al Jarreau
"Get Ready", a 1960s R&B classic by The Temptations

See also
J-Setting
Jackson State–Southern University rivalry
Honda Battle of the Bands

References

Further reading

External links 
Official Sonic Boom of the South website

College marching bands in the United States
Jackson State University
Musical groups established in 1940
Southwestern Athletic Conference marching bands
1940 establishments in Mississippi